Celebrando 25 Años de Juan Gabriel: En Concierto en el Palacio de Bellas Artes (Celebrating 25 Years of Juan Gabriel: Live from Bellas Artes) is the title of a live album by Mexican singer-songwriter Juan Gabriel. It was recorded on August 22, 1997 at the Palacio de Bellas Artes, in Mexico City and was released on January 13, 1998. The live album and was nominated for a Pop Album of the Year at the 1999 Lo Nuestro Awards.

Track listing
All tracks written by Juan Gabriel.

Disc 1

Disc 2

Sales and certifications

References

External links 
  official website Juan Gabriel
 official website on Universal Music
 [] on allmusic.com
  on itunes.apple.com

1998 live albums
Juan Gabriel live albums
Spanish-language live albums